Emdebian Grip is a discontinued small-footprint Linux distribution based on and compatible with Debian.  Compared to Debian, it provides more fine-grained control over the package selection, size, dependencies and content, enabling that way creation of small and efficient Debian packages for use on resource-limited embedded systems.  As a result, reduced installation size is one of the main benefits coming from the Emdebian Grip.

, the Emdebian Grip project is terminated with no available updates or planned new releases, leaving the version 3.1, which is based on Debian 7.1 ("wheezy"), as the no longer supported latest stable release.

Overview 
Emdebian Grip re-packs  package files made available by Debian, removing unneeded files such as man pages, info documents, documentation, and unwanted translation files.  As such, Emdebian Grip is a Debian distribution builder; the  command (from the  package) processes a  package compiled for any of the architectures supported by Debian and generates an equivalent Emdebian Grip package.  That way, the binaries, maintainer scripts and dependencies of the original Debian packages are left untouched, but the overall size and the installation footprint of the packages are reduced.

Packages created by Emdebian Grip are not recompiled, so they are completely binary compatible with Debian.  As a result, Emdebian Grip maintains as much compatibility as possible with Debian; it is even possible to mix Emdebian and Debian packages, or even to migrate an existing Debian system to Emdebian Grip.

Releases 

Emdebian Grip provides complete package repositories for seven architectures: i386, amd64, powerpc, armhf, armel, mips and mipsel.

Since version 3.0, all Emdebian Grip suites and codenames include additional "-grip" suffix, compared to their equivalent Debian suites and codenames.

On July 13, 2014, an end-of-life notice posted on the project's web site announced that updates to Emdebian Grip are stopped, leaving the version 3.1, which is based on Debian 7.1 ("wheezy"), as the no longer supported latest stable release.  The main reasons stated as the cause for ending the project were a lack of embedded devices that do not provide support for expandable storage, and too much work involved with preparing the updates and releasing new versions.

See also 

 BitBake a make-like build tool focusing on cross-compilation for embedded Linux
 Comparison of Linux distributions compared by the features, support for different architectures, package management, etc.
 ebuild a specialized bash script for automating compilation and installation of software packages
 List of Linux distributions categorized by the major base distribution or used package management system
 OpenEmbedded a software framework for creating embedded Linux distributions

Notes

References

External links 
 
 Emdebian support for translation packages (tdebs), November 19, 2014

Debian-based distributions
X86-64 Linux distributions
Cross-platform software
Linux distributions